The 2020 Federated Auto Parts 400 was a NASCAR Cup Series race held on September 12, 2020, at Richmond Raceway in Richmond, Virginia. Contested over 400 laps on the  D-shaped short track, it was the 28th race of the 2020 NASCAR Cup Series season, second race of the Playoffs and second race of the Round of 16.

Report

Background

Richmond Raceway (RR), formerly known as Richmond International Raceway (RIR), is a 3/4-mile (1.2 km), D-shaped, asphalt race track located just outside Richmond, Virginia in Henrico County. It hosts the NASCAR Cup Series, the NASCAR Xfinity Series, NASCAR Gander RV & Outdoors Truck Series and the IndyCar series. Known as "America's premier short track", it formerly hosted two USAC sprint car races.

Entry list
 (R) denotes rookie driver.
 (i) denotes driver who are ineligible for series driver points.

Qualifying
Kevin Harvick was awarded the pole for the race as determined by competition-based formula.

Starting Lineup

Race

Stage Results

Stage One
Laps: 80

Stage Two
Laps: 155

Final Stage Results

Stage Three
Laps: 165

Race statistics
 Lead changes: 19 among 9 different drivers
 Cautions/Laps: 3 for 21
 Red flags: 0
 Time of race: 2 hours, 56 minutes and 42 seconds
 Average speed:

Media

Television
NBC Sports covered the race on the television side. Rick Allen, Jeff Burton, Steve Letarte and three-time Richmond winner Dale Earnhardt Jr. covered the race from the booth at Charlotte Motor Speedway. Dave Burns, Parker Kligerman and Marty Snider handled the pit road duties on site.

Radio
The Motor Racing Network had the radio call for the race, which was also simulcast on Sirius XM NASCAR Radio. Alex Hayden, Jeff Striegle and Rusty Wallace had the call in the broadcast booth for MRN when the field races through the front straightaway. Dave Moody called the race from a platform when the field races down the backstraightaway. Jason Toy and Kim Coon called the action for MRN from pit lane.

Standings after the race

Drivers' Championship standings

Manufacturers' Championship standings

Note: Only the first 16 positions are included for the driver standings.

References

2020 in sports in Virginia
2020 NASCAR Cup Series
2020
September 2020 sports events in the United States
2020 in Richmond, Virginia